The Kashmir nutcracker or large-spotted nutcracker (Nucifraga multipunctata) is a passerine bird related to the spotted nutcracker. Until recently, it was considered a subspecies.  It is found in the western Himalayas.

Taxonomy and systematics 
The Kashmir nutcracker is closely related to the Eurasian nutcracker (N. caryocatactes) and has only been split from it recently. Some authorities still treat these forms as conspecific. The two species are similar in appearance, though the Kashmir nutcracker in distinguished by a more whitish general appearance, along with a contrasting blackish crown, wing, and base of tail. It also has bold white spots on the base of its tail, with a relatively slimmer tail, and longer tail.

It is monotypic.

Description 
It is a distinctive corvid with heavily streaked and spotted plumage. They are usually  in length.

It has a blackish crown and nape, with the sides of the head and the body plumage being blackish gray-brown. The body has heavy white streaking, spotting, and striping. Although the bird looks whitish from a distance, the breast and flanks show more brown than the rest of the body, also having more bold spotting. The wings are glossy black, with white tips on the coverts and secondaries. The tail is also glossy black and has white tips on all the rectrices. The vents and undertail coverts are completely white in colour. The bill is relatively slim, conical, pointed, and black in color.

Vocalisations 
Their vocalisations are poorly studied, but are described as being extremely similar to those of the Eurasian nutcracker. Begging juveniles make calls that have been described as "somewhat reminiscent of the squealing of little pigs". Other calls have been described as very variable, although it is not known if they are simply variations of a single call type, or are in fact individual calls.

The most common call is a loud and harsh nasal 'kraa', which is usually given doubled or tripled, and repeated in rapidly 6–7 times. It is quite distinctive and may have slower or faster variants. One possible variant is the 'reek', which is a less nasal and harsher call that is given in a different context. They also make a 'reer', which is a slightly overslurred call, more nasal than the other two, but with an uncertain function. They have a whisper song, though it is not a true song, like most corvid songs. It is described as a mixture of harsh notes which are higher in pitch than most of the typical calls produced by this species, and mixed with click-gulping nasal notes. The songs exhibit significant variation.

The birds are typically heard early in the day. The 'kraa' calls are given from conifer trees, at varying heights, while 'reek' calls have been recorded from birds perched some metres off the ground, and 'reer' call are typically observed from birds that are near or on the ground.

Distribution and habitat 
It is found in eastern Afghanistan, north and western Pakistan, Kashmir, and northwestern India, with its range possibly extending to extreme southwestern parts of the Tibet Autonomous region in China.

It inhabits coniferous forests and mixed conifer and oak forests, especially in forests composed of blue pine, Pinus gerardiana, and Morinda spruce. It may descend to lower altitudes in late summer to collect nuts for winter stores. It is also frequently attracted to human habitation.

Behaviour and ecology

Diet 
Its diet is similar to that of the Eurasian nutcracker. It feeds on conifer seeds, mainly from Morinda spruce, P. gerardiana, and acorns from holly oak. It has also been reported taking walnuts and hazelnuts for winter stores.

Reproduction 
Breeding season is thought to be in May–July, but egg-laying is probably earlier, in February–March. Nest with live young have been observed as early as the second week of March in Himachal Pradesh. The breeding season in Afghanistan ends around late April to early May, indicating that the mays hatch around January to late February.

It is a solitary nester, and has a single brood, though it may lay replacement eggs if the first egg is lost.

The nests are well-built and have a deep cup. The nests are made out of twigs, decorated with lichens, and are lined with soft roots and pine needles.

Eggs are laid in clutches of 3–4 eggs. Parents are thought to share incubation.

Status 
The bird is not considered threatened. It is observed near human settlements in its range, suggesting that it may be able to adapt to humans, although more research is needed to assess how much habitat disturbance it can tolerate.

References

Rasmussen, P.C., and J.C. Anderton. 2005. Birds of South Asia. The Ripley guide. Volume 2: attributes and status. Smithsonian Institution and Lynx Edicions, Washington D.C. and Barcelona.

Kashmir nutcracker
Birds of Afghanistan
Birds of North India
Birds of Pakistan
Birds of Central Asia
Kashmir nutcracker